Triznatsi Rocks is the group of three adjacent rocks off the northwest coast of Nelson Island in the South Shetland Islands, Antarctica extending 144 m in west–east direction and 122 m in south–north direction. Their surface areas are 0.33 ha, 0.17 ha and 0.14 ha respectively. The vicinity was visited by early 19th century sealers.

The rocks are so named because of their configuration, 'triznatsi' being the Bulgarian for 'triplets.'

Location
British mapping in 1968.

See also
 List of Antarctic and subantarctic islands

Maps
 Livingston Island to King George Island. Scale 1:200000.  Admiralty Nautical Chart 1776.  Taunton: UK Hydrographic Office, 1968.
 South Shetland Islands. Scale 1:200000 topographic map No. 3373. DOS 610 - W 62 58. Tolworth, UK, 1968.
Antarctic Digital Database (ADD). Scale 1:250000 topographic map of Antarctica. Scientific Committee on Antarctic Research (SCAR). Since 1993, regularly upgraded and updated.

References

 Bulgarian Antarctic Gazetteer. Antarctic Place-names Commission. (details in Bulgarian, basic data in English)

External links
 Triznatsi Rocks. Adjusted Copernix satellite image

Rock formations of the South Shetland Islands
Bulgaria and the Antarctic